The Sign on the Door is a 1921 American silent drama film starring Norma Talmadge and Lew Cody. The film was directed and written by Herbert Brenon, and based upon the 1919 play of the same name by Channing Pollock. A copy of this film is in the Library of Congress film archive.

A second adaptation of the play was filmed in 1929 as The Locked Door, starring Barbara Stanwyck.

Cast
 Norma Talmadge as Ann Hunniwell / Mrs. 'Lafe' Regan
 Charles Richman as 'Lafe' Regan
 Lew Cody as Frank Devereaux
 David Proctor as Colonel Gaunt
 Augustus Balfour as Ferguson, Devereaux's Valet
 Mac Barnes as 'Kick' Callahan
 Helen Weir as Helen Regan
 Robert Agnew as Alan Churchill
 Norma Shearer as bit part (uncredited)

References

External links

1921 films
1921 drama films
Silent American drama films
American silent feature films
American black-and-white films
American films based on plays
Films directed by Herbert Brenon
First National Pictures films
1920s American films